Malapterurus occidentalis is a species of electric catfish native to Gambia and Guinea-Bissau, where it occurs in the Gambia and Géba Rivers. This species grows to a length of  SL.

References

Malapteruridae
Freshwater fish of West Africa
Taxa named by Steven Mark Norris
Fish described in 2002
Strongly electric fish